Sergio Roitman, the defending champion, lost to Martín Alund already in the first round.
Nicolás Lapentti defeated Santiago Giraldo 6–2, 2–6, 7–6(4) in the final match.

Seeds

Draw

Finals

Top half

Bottom half

References
 Main Draw
 Qualifying Draw

Challenger Ciudad de Guayaquil - Singles
2009 Singles